The 2016 NCAA Women's Water Polo Championship was the 16th annual tournament to determine the national champion of NCAA women's collegiate water polo. Tournament matches were played at the UCLA Spieker Aquatics Center in Los Angeles, California from May 13–15, 2016. The USC Trojans defeated the 2015 champions, the Stanford Cardinal, 8-7 to win their fifth national title, while finishing the season 26-0.

Qualification
Since there is only one NCAA championship for women's water polo, all women's water polo programs, whether from Division I, Division II, or Division III, are eligible. For the first time, ten teams participated in the tournament. The automatic qualifiers came from the following conferences: Big West Conference, Collegiate Water Polo Association, Golden Coast Conference, Metro Atlantic Athletic Conference, Mountain Pacific Sports Federation, Southern California Intercollegiate Athletic Conference, and Western Water Polo Association. Three additional teams were selected at large without geographical restrictions by the selection committee. The four lowest seeded teams played in the two play-in games on Tuesday, May 10.

Play-in games
Site: RIMAC (UC San Diego), San Diego, California

Tournament bracket
Site: Spieker Aquatics Center (UCLA), Los Angeles, California

All Tournament Team 
TBD

See also 
 NCAA Men's Water Polo Championship

Notes 
 Game time each day: Noon, 1:45 p.m., 3:30 p.m., 5:15 p.m. (local time)

References

NCAA Women's Water Polo Championship
NCAA Women's Water Polo Championship
2016
NCAA Women's Water Polo
May 2016 sports events in the United States